D. D. Terry (born February 16, 1984) is a former American football running back. He was signed by the Jacksonville Jaguars as an undrafted free agent in 2007. He played college football at Sam Houston.

Terry was also a member of the Houston Texans and Omaha Nighthawks.

Early years
Terry attended Willis High School in Willis, Texas  and lettered in football, basketball, and track. In football, he was an All-District linebacker. He graduated from Willis High School in 2002.

College career
Terry attended Kilgore Junior College for a year in 2003 and was a student and a letterman in football. In football, he cracked the starting lineup as a defensive back. He started for 2 yrs at RB. For Sam Houston State. He broke multiple school records while running for over 1,000 yards both seasons.

Professional career

Jacksonville Jaguars
Terry went undrafted in the 2007 NFL Draft. He was later signed by the Jacksonville Jaguars in May 2007. He spent the entire 2007 season on the Jaguars practice squad. On June 11, 2008, Terry was released by the Jaguars.

Houston Texans
On September 24, 2008, Terry was signed to the practice squad of the Houston Texans after the team released running back Arliss Beach. Terry was released on October 8 when the team signed running back Ryan Moats to its practice squad. Team re-signed Terry to the practice squad on October 29. He was released again on November 5.

External links
Houston Texans bio
 Jacksonville Jaguars bio

1984 births
Living people
People from Willis, Texas
Sportspeople from the Houston metropolitan area
American football running backs
Sam Houston Bearkats football players
Jacksonville Jaguars players
Houston Texans players
Omaha Nighthawks players